List of bridge–tunnels:

List

See also
Transcontinental railroads have many bridge–tunnels.
Intercontinental and transoceanic fixed links 

Tunnel
Bridge